Mylothris ertli is a butterfly in the family Pieridae. It is found in Tanzania, from the southern shores of Lake Victoria to the Kigoma and Mpanda Districts.

References

Butterflies described in 1904
Pierini
Endemic fauna of Tanzania
Butterflies of Africa